Ronald Couce Menezes (born 6 November 1962) is a Brazilian former freestyle swimmer.

At the 1980 South American Championships, Menezes won the 100 meters freestyle and the 200 IM medley. At the 1981 Summer Universiade, held in Bucharest, Menezes won a bronze medal in the 4×100-metre freestyle relay.

He was at the 1983 Pan American Games, in Caracas, where he won the silver medal in the 4×100-metre freestyle.

At the 1984 Summer Olympics, in Los Angeles, he finished 10th in the 4×100-metre freestyle, and 28th in the 100-metre freestyle.

References

External links 
 
 

1962 births
Living people
Brazilian male medley swimmers
Brazilian male freestyle swimmers
Olympic swimmers of Brazil
Swimmers at the 1983 Pan American Games
Swimmers at the 1984 Summer Olympics
Pan American Games silver medalists for Brazil
Pan American Games medalists in swimming
Universiade medalists in swimming
Universiade bronze medalists for Brazil
Medalists at the 1981 Summer Universiade
Medalists at the 1983 Pan American Games
20th-century Brazilian people